WTMX (101.9 FM "The Mix") is a hot AC radio station in Chicago, Illinois. Licensed to the suburb of Skokie, it is owned by Hubbard Broadcasting.  WTMX has its studios located at One Prudential Plaza and its transmitter co-located atop Willis Tower (the former Sears Tower).

WTMX broadcasts in the HD digital hybrid format.

History

WRSV
The station began broadcasting August 18, 1961, and held the call sign WRSV, which stood for "Radio Skokie Valley", its owner at the time. Radio Skokie Valley was owned by M. Earlene Stebbins. The station aired a full service format, with a wide variety of local programs along with classical music and standards.

The station originally broadcast at 98.3 MHz. Its transmitter was located in Skokie, Illinois, and had an ERP of 1,000 watts at a HAAT of 125 feet. The station's frequency resulted in interference problems with 98.7 WFMT. To eliminate this problem, WRSV's frequency was changed to 101.9 MHz in 1966. The frequency became available in 1964, when 101.9 WCLM in Chicago had its license revoked.

In 1969, the station's transmitter was moved to the Civic Opera Building and its ERP was increased to 12,000 watts. In 1970, controlling interest in Radio Skokie Valley was sold to Bonneville International for $479,000.

WCLR
On December 10, 1970, the station's call sign was changed to WCLR, standing for "clear", a theme that was used heavily in its advertising. WCLR aired a beautiful music format through 1975. WCLR played approximately 75% instrumentals, along with contemporary easy listening vocals and a few standards. In 1971, the station's transmitter was moved to the John Hancock Center, and in 1974 its transmitter was moved to the Sears Tower.

In 1975, the station shifted to middle of the road (MOR) format, with an 80/20 vocal to instrumental ratio, in contrast to its previous strong emphasis on instrumental music. The station played a mixture of pop standards, easy listening, and soft rock.

By the early 1980s, WCLR's format had shifted to adult contemporary. The station aired a Saturday night all-request oldies program in the 1980s, hosted by Peter Dean. In the late 1980s, WCLR was branded "Chicago's Lite Rock".

WTMX
On February 21, 1989, the station's call sign was changed to WTMX, and it became known as "The New Mix 102", airing a mix of adult contemporary and oldies. By 1992, the station's format had shifted to hot AC.

In the mid 1990s, the station shifted towards a modern AC/modern rock format, and on January 25, 1996, it adopted the slogan "Today's Rock Mix". By 2006, the station's format shifted to Adult Top 40.

On January 19, 2011, Bonneville International announced the sale of WTMX, as well as 16 other stations, to Hubbard Broadcasting. The sale was completed on April 29, 2011.

From September 1996 until 2017, WTMX was home to the "Eric & Kathy" morning show hosted by Eric Ferguson and Kathy Hart. The show drew consistently strong ratings, and the duo was inducted into the National Radio Hall of Fame in 2016. In April 2017, Kathy Hart left the program, and on September 7, 2017, Hubbard Radio announced that she would not be returning to the station. Ferguson continued to host mornings, along with Melissa McGurren, Brian "Whip" Paruch, Violeta Podrumedic, Melissa "MelD" Dever, Cynthia DeNicolo and John "Swany" Swanson, and the show was rebranded as "Eric in the Morning with Melissa and Whip". During the COVID-19 pandemic, Melissa "MelD" Dever and Cynthia DeNicolo were laid off from the show. On June 18, 2020, an internal restructure of talent was announced with the Nikki hosting the Midday show, Chris Petlak with Lisa Allen hosting Afternoon MIX, and Jordan "Dash" Orman–Weiss hosting the evening show and THE MIX New Music Club.  

On December 16, 2020, after 22 years with WTMX, it was announced that Melissa McGurren had declined a contract extension, much to station management's surprise. Jeff England, Vice President and Market Manager at Hubbard Chicago, stated, "We were disappointed by her decision not to renew her contract, but also know that this year has led all of us to assess our lives in different ways. When she informed me of her decision, she described her time at the station as 'a privilege' and that feeling is completely mutual. We wish her the best."

On October 29, 2021, WTMX morning show host Eric Ferguson released a statement that he and the station agreed that he will be stepping away from radio for the time being after allegations of sexual harassment by Ferguson began to surface. On January 18, 2022, the station announced that afternoon host Chris Petlak would join Nikki, Whip, Violeta, and Swany as host of “The Morning MIX.”

References

External links

The Mix's Eric Ferguson co-hosts "Live! With Regis & Kelly, Chicago Sun-Times, January 27, 2011
Chicago's celebrity dads dish on fatherhood - 101.9fm THE MIX's Eric Ferguson, Chicago Parent, May 24, 2010

Hot adult contemporary radio stations in the United States
TMX
Hubbard Broadcasting
Radio stations established in 1961
1961 establishments in Illinois